is a 1963 Japanese drama action film directed by Senkichi Taniguchi, with special effects by Eiji Tsuburaya. The film stars Toshiro Mifune and Mie Hama.

The film is often confused with the theme of fantasy instead of tokusatsu but, the book Toho Special Effects All Monster Encyclopedia specifically identifies it in the genre of tokusatsu fantasy. It was also released as Samurai Pirate in the United States.

Cast
 Toshiro Mifune as Sukezaemon Naya
 Makoto Sato as the Black Pirate
 Jun Funato as Ming, the Prince of Thailand
 Ichiro Arishima as Sennin the Wizard
 Mie Hama as Princess Yaya
 Kumi Mizuno as Miwa
 Akiko Wakabayashi as Yaya's maid

Production
The film was based on a screenplay by Takeshi Kimura and Shinichi Sekizawa which was based on a treatment by Toshio Yasumi.

Release
The Lost World of Sinbad was distributed theatrically in Japan by Toho on October 26, 1963. The film was Toho's third highest-grossing film in Japan in 1963 and the 10th highest grossing domestically.

The film was distributed by American International Pictures in the United States with an English-language version, where it was re-titled Samurai Pirate, and then again re-titled The Lost World of Sinbad. The film was released as a double feature in the United States with War of the Zombies on March 17, 1965. It was released in the United Kingdom in 1976.

See also
 List of Japanese films of 1963

References

Footnotes

Sources

External links

1963 films
Films based on Sinbad the Sailor
Films produced by Tomoyuki Tanaka
Films directed by Senkichi Taniguchi
Films with screenplays by Shinichi Sekizawa
Japanese fantasy adventure films
Toho films
1960s Japanese films